Stag  is the eighth studio album by American rock band the Melvins, released in 1996 through Atlantic Records. This is the final album the band released under Atlantic before being dropped from the label. Promotional singles were released for the songs "The Bit" and "Bar-X the Rocking M" with the latter having a music video.

Track listing
All words and music written by Buzz Osborne, except where noted.

Personnel
King Buzzo – guitar & vocals; all instrumentation (2), backing vocals (7), moog (9), bass (11), drums (12), interlude guitar (13); engineer, producer & mixer (1–3 & 5–15)
Mark D – bass; additional guitar (1, 3, 6, 7), all instrumentation (4), slide guitar (5), backing vocals (7), moog & drum beat (9), guitar (11, 12), vocals (12), interlude guitar, baritone guitar & piano (all 13); engineer, producer & mixer (1 & 3–15)
Dale C – drums & percussion; additional guitar & sitar (1), bongos & backing vocals (7), moog (9), guitar (11), all instrumentation & vocals (16); engineer, producer & mixer (1, 3 & 5–16)
with
Dirty Walt – valve trombone (3)
Mac Mann – organ & grand piano (3)
Bill Bartell – guitar (11)
Mackie Osborne – drums (12); illustration & design

Additional personnel
GGGarth – engineer, producer & mixer (1, 3, 5–7, 9, 10, 13–15); backing vocals (7)
Joe Barresi – engineer, producer & mixer (1, 3, 5–7, 9, 10, 13–15)
Alex Newport – engineer, producer & mixer (8)
Chris Kozlowski – engineer, producer & mixer (11)
Stephen Marcussen – mastering
Ron Boustead – mastering
David Lefkowitz – management & fan club

Charts

Album
Billboard (North America)

References

Melvins albums
1996 albums
Albums produced by Joe Barresi
Albums produced by Garth Richardson
Atlantic Records albums
Alternative metal albums by American artists
Sludge metal albums
Albums recorded at A&M Studios